The XI International AIDS Conference was held in Vancouver July 7–12, 1996. The theme of the conference was "One World One Hope".

Highlights
The conference's co-chairs were Martin Schechter, Julio Montaner, Michael O´Shaughnessy and Michael Rekart. Donna Shalala gave the plenary address.

This was the first conference after the technological advance of being able to measure HIV viral load.

A study presented showed that United States military had higher risk of HIV infection.

The conference presented the introduction of combination therapy using protease inhibitors. Within a week after the conference, over 75,000 patients who had been using antibiotics and chemotherapy as treatment against opportunistic infections began an effective antiviral regimen which greatly increased their immune system strength and therefore their health.

References

External links
a personal account
Science Magazine special issue on AIDS for the conference
In back alleys near Vancouver's AIDS conference, the disease was gaining ground

International AIDS Conferences
International conferences in Canada
1996 in Canada
1996 conferences
History of Vancouver
July 1996 events in Canada